The Dark River, New Zealand is a river of Fiordland, New Zealand. It rises west of Barrier Peak and flows westward through Fiordland National Park into Lake Grave, which drains into Te Hāpua / Sutherland Sound.

See also
List of rivers of New Zealand

References

Land Information New Zealand - Search for Place Names

Rivers of Fiordland